Pampierstad is a town in Frances Baard District Municipality in the Northern Cape province of South Africa.

The town lies in the northern part of the Vaalharts irrigation scheme and 14 km from Hartswater. Residents mainly speak Tswana.

Education

Pampierstad consist of 6 Primary schools, 2 Secondaries and 2 High schools
 Primary Schools
 Pabalelo 
 Bontleng
 Gaoshupe Makodi
 Mooki Lobelo
 Simon Medupe
 Kgono

Secondary Schools
 Olehile Manchwe
 Reitlamile

High Schools
 Kgomotso
 Pampierstad High

References

People of Pampierstad majority were forcefully moved from Jan Kempdorp location and others from Hartswater Thagadiepelajang in the early 60's.

Populated places in the Phokwane Local Municipality